Appian (Αππιανός) was a Roman historian. 

Appian may also refer to:

Places 
 Appian Way (Via Appia), an important ancient Roman road, constructed by Appius Claudius Caecus
 Appian Way, Burwood, Sydney, street in the suburb of Burwood in Sydney, New South Wales, Australia
 Appian Way Regional Park, protected area of around 3400 hectares, established by the Italian region of Latium

Organizations 
 Appian Graphics, supplier of multi-monitor graphics accelerators
 Appian Publications & Recordings, British company specialising in the restoration and re-issue of early recordings of classical music
 Appian Technology, previously called ZyMOS Corporation, a semiconductor manufacturing company in Sunnyvale, California
 Appian Way Productions, film production company in West Hollywood, California, established by actor and producer Leonardo DiCaprio
 Appian Corporation, a cloud-computing company based in Virginia

People 
Adolphe Appian (born 1819), French landscape painter and etcher
 Saint Appian, 4th-century martyr

See also 
 Appia (disambiguation)
 Apian (disambiguation)